Entyloma is a genus of smut fungi in the family Entylomataceae. The genus was described by Anton de Bary in 1874. A 2008 estimates places about 180 species in the genus. The anamorph form of Entyloma  is Entylomella.

Species

E. acanthocephali
E. achilleae
E. aeschynomenis
E. ageratinae
E. agoseridis
E. aldamae
E. alopecurivorum
E. amaranthi
E. ambrosiae-maritimae
E. ameghinoi
E. anadelphiae
E. anceps
E. antennariae
E. aposeridis
E. aquaticum
E. arctothecae
E. arctotis
E. aristolochiae
E. armoraciae
E. arnaudianum
E. arnicae
E. arnicale
E. arnoseridis
E. asteris-alpini
E. asteris-sericei
E. asterisci
E. asterisci-maritimi
E. atlanticum
E. australe
E. bavaricum
E. bellidiastri
E. bellidis
E. bergeniae
E. blumeae
E. boltoniae
E. boraginis
E. bracteanthae
E. browalliae
E. bullulum
E. bupleuri
E. calceolariae
E. calendulae
E. catananches
E. catananchis
E. ceratocephali
E. chaenorrhini
E. chelidonii
E. chilense
E. chloridis
E. chrysosplenii
E. cichorii
E. circaeae
E. cissigenum
E. clintonianum
E. collinsiae
E. comaclinii
E. commelinae
E. compositarum
E. convolvuli
E. coreopsis
E. corydalis
E. cosmi
E. costaricense
E. crepidicola
E. crepidis
E. crepidis-rubrae
E. crepidis-tectori
E. cynoglossi
E. cynosuri
E. cyperi
E. dahliae
E. davisii
E. debonianum
E. deliliae
E. deschampsiae
E. diastateae
E. doebbeleri
E. dubium
E. echinaceae
E. echinopis
E. ecuadorense
E. ellisii
E. erigerontis
E. erodianum
E. erodii
E. eryngii
E. eryngii-alpini
E. eryngii-dichotomi
E. eryngii-plani
E. eryngii-tricuspidati
E. eschscholziae
E. espinosae
E. eugeniarum
E. eupatorii
E. farisii
E. fergussonii
E. feurichii
E. ficariae
E. fimbriatum
E. flavum
E. floerkeae
E. fragosoi
E. frondosa
E. fumariae
E. fuscum
E. gaillardiae
E. gaillardianum
E. galinsogae
E. garcilassae
E. garhadioli
E. gaudinae
E. gaudiniae
E. geranti
E. globigenum
E. glyceriae
E. grampiansis
E. gratiolae
E. guaraniticum
E. guizotiae
E. helenii
E. helosciadii
E. henningsiana
E. henningsianum
E. heterothecae
E. hieracii
E. hieroense
E. holwayi
E. hydrocotyles
E. hypecoi
E. hypochaeridis
E. incertum
E. jaegeriae
E. kazachstanicum
E. khandalensis
E. korshinskyi
E. kundmanniae
E. lagerheimianum
E. lagerheimii
E. lapponicum
E. lavrovianum
E. leontices
E. leontodontis
E. lepachydis
E. leucanthemi
E. leucomaculans
E. linariae
E. lini
E. lithophragmatis
E. lobeliae
E. ludwigianum
E. madiae
E. magnusii
E. magocsyanum
E. maireanum
E. majewskii
E. maroccanum
E. martindalei
E. matricariae
E. meconopsidis
E. medicaginis
E. mediterraneum
E. meliloti
E. menispermi
E. microsporum
E. moniliferum
E. montis-rainieri
E. mundkurii
E. myosuri
E. mysorense
E. nierenbergiae
E. nigellae
E. nigricans
E. novae-zelandiae
E. nubilum
E. obionum
E. occultum
E. oenanthes
E. oenotherae
E. pachydermum
E. pammelii
E. paradoxum
E. parietariae
E. parthenii
E. pastinacae
E. pavlovii
E. peninsulae
E. peregrinum
E. petuniae
E. peullense
E. phalaridis
E. physalidis
E. picridis
E. plantaginis
E. poae
E. podospermi
E. polygoni-amphibii
E. polygoni-punctati
E. polypogonis
E. polysporum
E. primulae
E. pustulosum
E. ranunculacearum
E. ranunculi-repentis
E. ranunculi-scelerati
E. ranunculorum
E. rhagadioli
E. saccardoanum
E. saniculae
E. scalianum
E. semenoviana
E. serotinum
E. sidae-rhombifoliae
E. siegesbeckiae
E. sonchi
E. speciosum
E. spectabile
E. spegazzinii
E. spilanthis
E. sporoboli
E. spragueanum
E. sydowianum
E. tagetesium
E. tanaceti
E. taraxaci
E. terrieri
E. thalictri
E. thirumalacharii
E. tichomirovii
E. tolpidis
E. tomilinii
E. tozziae
E. trigonellae
E. ulei
E. uliginis
E. unamunoi
E. urocystoides
E. variabile
E. veronicae
E. verruculosum
E. vignae
E. vulpiae
E. winteri
E. wisconsiniense
E. wroblewskii
E. wyomingense
E. xanthii
E. xauense
E. zacintha
E. zinniae

References

External links

Basidiomycota genera
Fungal plant pathogens and diseases
Ustilaginomycotina
Taxa described in 1874